Morton S. Wolf (1907 – June 5, 1976) was a realty executive. He was the founder of Spencer-Taylor Inc., a real estate development and hotel management firm. He founded the company together with his brother Charles S. Wolf. Under Wolf's direction, Spencer-Taylor over the years operated the Ritz Tower, Delmonico, the Mayflower, Surrey, One Fifth Avenue, Beaux-Arts, and Peter Cooper hotels. He conceived and developed a number of real estate projects, including Washington Square Village in New York City, and contributed to the Renaissance I building projects in the Golden Triangle in Pittsburgh, which included Chatham Center. As part of the Chatham project, he conceived the idea of placing a hotel atop an office building.

Wolf traveled abroad as a real estate consultant for the State Department under President Harry S. Truman in 1950. Among his many philanthropic activities, he served on the board of St. Vincent's Hospital, and was a real estate consultant for the Archdiocese of New York.

Wolf died in New Rochelle Hospital. He lived in Larchmont, NY.

1907 births
1976 deaths
20th-century American businesspeople